The Life Sciences Institute (LSI) is a collaborative, multidisciplinary research institution located on the campus of the University of Michigan in Ann Arbor. It encompasses 27 faculty-led teams from 13 schools and departments throughout U-M. The LSI brings together leading scientists from a variety of life science disciplines, working with a range of models systems and cutting-edge research tools, to accelerate breakthroughs and discoveries that will broaden understanding of the basic processes of life and lead to new treatments to improve human health.

Of the university's $823 million in research expenditures, more than half is allocated for research in the life sciences, and the LSI is a cornerstone of this effort.

History
In 1998, the University of Michigan formed a commission to create a vision for the future of the life sciences at the university. In response to the commission's recommendations, in 1999, the Regents of the University of Michigan unanimously approved the construction of the Life Sciences Institute, noting that "the creation of a life sciences institute will eliminate the structural barriers to a shared research and learning experience that will be valuable for both basic and applied research." Initial funding of $100 million was provided for the creation of wet lab space, in addition to the $130 million for the endowment and startup costs.

The first faculty members moved into the building and opened their labs in September 2003, and the institute celebrated its grand opening in May 2004. That same year, the institute's first two research cores opened, supporting high-throughput screening and structural biology research : the Center for Structural Biology and the Center for Chemical Genomics. The cryo-electron microscopy facility opened in 2009, expanding the institute's structural biology capabilities. In 2018, with support from the U-M Biosciences Initiative, the institute began expanding the cryo-EM program and also launched its Natural Products Discovery Core.

In 2021, the building that houses the institute was renamed Mary Sue Coleman Hall, in honor of President Emerita Mary Sue Coleman.

Leadership

Roger D. Cone, Ph.D., began his tenure as the Mary Sue Coleman Director of the University of Michigan Life Sciences Institute in September 2016. A leading researcher in brain regulation of body weight, Cone also serves as vice provost and director of U-M's biosciences initiative. The managing director is Anna Schork.

The institute's first director was Jack E. Dixon. In 2002, Mary Sue Coleman, U-M's president, appointed cell biologist and expert on insulin signaling Alan R. Saltiel as director. Saltiel served as the director until 2015, followed by interim director Stephen Weiss, M.D., who led the institute from 2015 to 2016.

Research
The Life Sciences Institute is a multidisciplinary basic science research institute, with focal strengths in chemical and structural biology. Its 23 faculty members lead labs specializing in a wide range of life sciences disciplines, including:

 cell biology
 genetics
 cancer biology
 metabolism and obesity
 neuroscience and neurodegeneration
 infectious disease
 structural biology
 chemical biology 
 chemistry

In addition to faculty labs, the institute is home to research cores that provide services to the institute, the university, and external  partners:

Center for Chemical Genomics
A high-throughput screening (HTS) facility is a central component of the Center for Chemical Genomics (CCG). This core facility is designed to assist academic researchers in carrying out high-throughput screens of chemical libraries and to identify new tools for biological research.

Center for Structural Biology
The Center for Structural Biology (CSB) is a "collaboratory" for X-ray crystallography, crystallization and protein engineering, and is a comprehensive structural biology resource for researchers at the University of Michigan and surrounding area.  The center includes:
 High-Throughput Protein Laboratory for protein engineering
 Protein Purification Facilities for small- and large-scale protein production
 Macromolecular Crystallization & Crystallography Laboratories for solving crystal structures of biological molecules
 On-site X-ray facility
 Access to high energy synchrotron radiation at Argonne National Laboratory through the Life Science Collaborative Access Team (LS-CAT)

Cryo-EM Facility
The cryo-EM facility at the Life Sciences Institute offers a wide range of advanced microscopes and technologies for cryo-electron microscopy, cryo-electron tomography, and correlative light and electron microscopy (CLEM).

Natural Products Discovery Core
The Natural Products Discovery Core is home to a library of more than 45,000 natural product extracts, as well as genome mining and bioinformatics services.

Facility

The LSI is a 235,000 square feet building with six floors, located between U-M's central campus and the university's medical campus in Ann Arbor. Completed in 2003, the building includes housing for wet lab and laboratory support spaces, administration offices, PI offices, interaction spaces, core laboratory areas, a combined gallery/lobby space and a small library.

The exterior design of the building is intended to harmonize with other campus loft-style structures, while also meeting the needs of a modern research institute.

LSI Symposium
The LSI Annual Symposium invites leading scientists from different disciplines to converge around a single topic. Past symposia have been designed to explore genetic insights into biology and disease, cancer, stem cell biology, evolutionary biology, autophagy and diseases of the nervous system.

Faculty 
List of the faculty currently working at the life sciences institute:

 Jay Brito Querido, Ph.D.
 Vivian Cheung, M.D.
 Michael Cianfrocco, Ph.D.
 Roger D. Cone, Ph.D. 
 David Ginsburg, M.D.
 Ken Inoki, M.D., Ph.D.
 Daniel Klionsky, Ph.D.
 Cheng-Yu Lee, Ph.D.
 Tzumin Lee, M.D., Ph.D.
 Peng Li, Ph.D.
 Jiandie Lin, Ph.D.
 Anna Mapp, Ph.D.
 Shyamal Mosalaganti, Ph.D.
 Alison R.H. Narayan, Ph.D.
 Melanie Ohi, Ph.D.
 Carole Parent, Ph.D.
 David Sherman, Ph.D.
Janet L. Smith, Ph.D.
Chelsey Spriggs, Ph.D.
Wenjing Wang, Ph.D.
Lois Weisman, Ph.D.
Stephen J. Weiss, M.D.
Connie Wu, Ph.D.
Jun Wu, Ph.D.
Shawn Xu, Ph.D.
Zhaohui Xu, Ph.D.
Bing Ye, Ph.D.

References

External links
Life Sciences Institute, University of Michigan
LSI Faculty list
U-M Center for Chemical Genomics
U-M Center for Stem Cell Biology 
LSI Cryo-EM Facility 
U-M Natural Products Discovery Core 
Jay Brito Querido Lab Website
Vivian Cheung Lab Website 
Michael Cianfrocco Lab Website
David Ginsburg Lab Website
Roger Cone Lab Website
David Ginsburg Lab website
Ken Inoki Lab Website 
Daniel Klionsky Lab Website
Cheng-Yu Lee Lab Website
Tzumin Lee Lab Website
Peng Li Lab Website
Jiandie Lin Lab Website
Anna Mapp Lab Website
Shayamal Mosalaganti Lab Website
Alison R.H. Narayan Lab Website
Melanie Ohi Lab Website
Carole Parent lab website
David Sherman Lab Website
Janet L. Smith Lab Website
Chelsey Spriggs Lab Website
Wenjing Wang Lab Website
Lois Weisman Lab Website
Stephen J. Weiss Lab Website
Connie Wu Lab Website
Jun Wu Lab Website
Shawn Xu Lab Website
Zhaohui Xu Lab Website
Bing Ye Lab Website

Life Sciences Institute, University of Michigan
University of Michigan
2002 establishments in Michigan
University of Michigan campus